Cavatappi  is macaroni formed in a helical tube shape. Cavatappi is the Italian word for corkscrews. It is known by other names, including cellentani, amori, serpentini, spirali, or tortiglione. It is not to be confused with a different pasta shape that is often called "corkscrew pasta" and that also goes by several names, that other shape being fusilli, also known as rotini, eliche, girandole, tortiglioni, or spirali, which is distinguished by fusilli being a twisted flat pasta rather than cavatappi's hollow tube shape. Cavatappi is usually scored with lines or ridges (rigati in Italian) on the surface. Cavatappi is a type of macaroni, or thick, hollow pasta that is made without using eggs. It may be yellow in color, like most pastas, or have vegetables or a food coloring added to make it green or red. It can be used in a variety of dishes including salads, soups, and casseroles.

Etymology 
Cavatappi is an Italian word created by compounding cava and tappi, which literally means "stopper (or top or cap) extractor" (a corkscrew). It is known by many other names.

Origin 
Cavatappi is a generic name adopted by other brands that imitated Barilla's cellentani. This particular shape was born in the 1970s at Barilla in Parma when a set of pasta dies had been mistakenly made with a spiral (instead of straight) set of lines. These produced pasta in a spiral or spring (molla in Italian) shape. Barilla decided to name it after one of the most famous showpeople of the time, Adriano Celentano, who was nicknamed “il molleggiato”. As this name was trademarked by Barilla, other pasta producers had to use a less pop and evocative name like cavatappi (corkscrews).

Shape
The cavatappi shape is perhaps best described as a ridged tube extruded into a helix shape though a small number of rotations. The number of turns is commonly in the range of one to three (with less than one full turn, the shape degenerates into a twisted version of elbow macaroni).

Common recipes 
Cavatappi is used with Italian-style foods such as cavatappi Amatriciana, and cavatappi pomodoro. It is mostly found in tomato-based pasta sauces and is associated closely with different types of cheeses such as mozzarella, Parmesan, and provolone. It is a common choice for macaroni and cheese.

See also

References

External links 
 Recipetips.com glossary entry with picture

Types of pasta

zh:通心粉